Diaethria bacchis is a species of butterfly of the genus Diaethria. It was described by Edward Doubleday in 1849. It is found in Mexico.

References

Biblidinae
Butterflies described in 1849